The 1957 Barbarians tour of Canada was a series of matches played in April May 1957 in Canada by Barbarian F.C.

It was an historic tour, the first outside Great Britain for the invitational club.

Results 

1957 rugby union tours
1957 in Canadian rugby union
1956–57 in British rugby union
1957
1957